Caught on a Train is a British television play written by Stephen Poliakoff and directed by Peter Duffell, based on an overnight train journey across Europe, and following the route of a journey that Poliakoff had himself made from London to Vienna. It was first shown, as part of the BBC2 Playhouse series, on 31 October 1980, and was re-shown in 2001 and 2006.

The play stars Dame Peggy Ashcroft and Michael Kitchen, and the main supporting cast features Wendy Raebeck and Michael Sheard. The soundtrack was written by the jazz composer Mike Westbrook.

The play won a BAFTA Television Award and other plaudits in 1980.

Having previously been available on VHS, the play was released on DVD by BBC Worldwide in 2004, with an audio commentary by Poliakoff and the producer, Kenith Trodd.

References

External links
 The film's entry at the BFI Screenonline
Caught on a Train at the Internet Movie Database

1980 television plays
BBC television dramas